Suyunchi  or Babushka-general (transliteration of the Russian title of the film) is a 1982 Uzbek drama film directed by Melis Abzalov.

Plot
The film tells the story of Anzirat (played by Zaynab Sadriyeva), an elderly woman who lives in a small village in Soviet Uzbekistan with her son, daughter-in-law, and their ten children, all boys. Because of her strictness the villagers call Anzirat "Grandma-General".

Back in the 1930s, Anzirat headed the main farm of the village and went through many hardships. Even when she gets old, Anzirat does not want to rest and cannot put up with the laziness, greed, and negligence of some of the villagers. She tries to put things in order for her family. Her son, however, instead of helping his pregnant wife spends all his spare time building a family football team. Only after Anzirat's death do the residents of the village realize how empty their village is without her. They feel that Anzirat was the conscience of their village.

References

External links
 

1982 films
1982 drama films
Soviet drama films
Soviet-era Uzbek films
Uzbek-language films
Uzbekfilm films
Uzbekistani drama films